People Meet and Sweet Music Fills the Heart,, is a 1967 Danish/Swedish romantic comedy directed by Henning Carlsen and starring Harriet Andersson and Preben Neergaard. The film is based upon the 1944 novel by Jens August Schade.

Cast

Awards
People Meet and Sweet Music Fills the Heart won the Bodil Award for Best Danish Film in 1968, and for her leading role, the Swedish actress Andersson also received that year's Bodil Award for Best Actress. The film was also selected as the Danish entry for the Best Foreign Language Film at the 41st Academy Awards, but was not accepted as a nominee.

See also

 List of submissions to the 41st Academy Awards for Best Foreign Language Film
 List of Danish submissions for the Academy Award for Best Foreign Language Film

References

External links
People Meet and Sweet Music Fills the Heart at Den Danske Film Database (in Danish)
People Meet and Sweet Music Fills the Heart at Det Danske Filminstitut (in Danish)
 

1967 films
1967 romantic comedy films
1960s Danish-language films
Films based on Danish novels
Films directed by Henning Carlsen
Films scored by Krzysztof Komeda
Danish romantic comedy films
Best Danish Film Bodil Award winners